Inquisitor mirabelflorenti is a species of sea snail, a marine gastropod mollusk in the family Pseudomelatomidae, the turrids and allies.

Description
The length of the shell attains 27 mm.

Distribution
This marine species occurs off the Philippines.

References

 Cossignani T. (2016). Inquisitor mirabelflorenti (Gastropoda: Hypsogastropoda: Pseudomelatomidae) nuova specie dalle Flippine. Malacologia Mostra Mondiale. 91: 20

External links
 Gastropods.com: Inquisitor mirabelflorenti

mirabelflorenti
Gastropods described in 2016